Yanahuara District is a suburb within the city of Arequipa, Peru. Yanahuara is well known for its buildings built from sillar, a pearly white volcanic rock. At least 1/4 of the district's area is taken by "Umacollo", where various middle-class residential houses of the city are located. Yanahuara includes the popular avenue strip known as the "Avenida Ejército", where many banks and modern offices are also located. Its surroundings contain various well-cared churches of the Spanish-colonial era, as well as public parks and the well-known "el mirador e iglesia de Yanahuara", a popular spot where tourists concur to view the city and its background volcanoes.

Communities in Yanahuara

  Valencia
  Primavera
  Barrio Magisterial 2
  La Buganvillas
  Santa Cecilia
  Las Retamas
  San José
  Quinta Alpex
  Jardin
  Independencia Americana
  Entel Perú
  Cesar Vallejo
  Ibarguen
  Los Claveles
  Santa Beatriz
  Barreda
  Piedra Santa I
  Los Cedros
  Los Independientes
  La Estancia
  Torreblanca
  Buena Vista
  La Gruta
  Los Gladiolos
  La Rinconada
  Virgen del Carmen
  Magnopata
  Los Gladiolos
  Piedra Santa II
  Las Malvinas
  Quinta Santa Catalina
  Santa Patricia
  Quinta Las Casuarinas
  El Remanzo
  Quinta Claudia
  Quinta Leoncio Prado
  Los Sauces
  San Rafael
  Villa El Prado F30631
  Quinta La Cascada
  San Pedro
  El Texao
  Paisajista Chilina
  Luebke Reorganizada
  Antonio Raymondi
  Fraternidad
  Juan XXIII
  Quiroz Garcia
  Magisterial 174 III Etapa
  Nuestra Señora de Fatima
  Entel Perú
  La Rinconada
  El Silencio
  Quinta La Gruta
  Quinta García Calderón
  Quinta La Sevillana
  Quinta María Santos

Images

External links

  Official district web site

Districts of the Arequipa Province
Districts of the Arequipa Region